Jade Catherine Slack (3 May 1992 – 14 July 2002) was a ten-year-old British girl who died after swallowing five ecstasy tablets.

Ecstasy overdose
On 14 July 2002, ten-year-old Jade visited family friends Wayne Wood, 22, and Rebecca Hodgson, 21, to see their newborn baby. Whilst there, she uncovered high strength ecstasy tablets hidden in a cigarette box, and mistakening them for sweets, she took five of them.

She overheated, so Wood and Hodgson put her under the shower in a futile bid to cool her down. It wasn't until the arrival of other relatives 90 minutes later, that an ambulance was called and Jade was rushed to hospital.

Death and legacy
Jade died at the Royal Lancaster Infirmary that day. Wood and Hodgson were cleared of manslaughter, but Wood was jailed when he admitted to selling ecstasy.

Jade's best friend told a court that Jade started “acting funny”, moaning and begging to be kissed. She gave video-link evidence to Manchester Crown Court about the tragedy, and said Jade first went to a bedroom to lie down. She returned 15 to 20 minutes later “acting funny”. Her friend said: “She started speaking and shaking about at the same time. She couldn’t sit down for two minutes. She was slapping herself and saying, Stop slapping me’.”

She also said 17-year-old Kim Speak got Jade to admit she had taken two pills.

Coronation Street storyline
On 17 September 2007, ITV1's Coronation Street aired a storyline that saw the seven-year-old character Bethany Platt swallow an ecstasy pill that had been hidden inside her doll's head. There were rumours that the storyline could have been inspired by Jade's death, and Jade's mother, Beverly, told The Sun that she only decided to watch the episodes after "days of inner turmoil". She also said "If Coronation Street can get that message over and spare another family from going through the nightmare we’ve endured then it will do some good.
If it gets the message across properly then I have to support it".

References 

 http://news.bbc.co.uk/1/hi/england/lancashire/3117246.stm
 http://news.bbc.co.uk/1/hi/england/2131583.stm
 https://www.theguardian.com/society/2003/sep/21/drugsandalcohol.drugs
 https://www.independent.co.uk/news/uk/crime/couple-delayed-as--girl-10-died-from-ecstasy-overdose-579370.html
 http://announce.jpress.co.uk/10601974?s_source=jpnw_lanc

1992 births
2002 deaths
Drug-related deaths in England
English children
Accidental deaths in England
Child deaths